Tamir is a rural locality (a selo) in Kyakhtinsky District, Republic of Buryatia, Russia. The population was 661 as of 2010. There are 5 streets.

Geography 
Tamir is located 94 km southeast of Kyakhta (the district's administrative centre) by road. Shazagay is the nearest rural locality.

References 

Rural localities in Kyakhtinsky District